Harry Tarraway (22 April 1925 – 21 April 2002) was a British middle-distance runner. He competed in the men's 800 metres at the 1948 Summer Olympics.

References

External links

1925 births
2002 deaths
Athletes (track and field) at the 1948 Summer Olympics
British male middle-distance runners
Olympic athletes of Great Britain